Branko Žigić (born 30 December 1981) is a Serbian professional football coach and a former player who played as a defender. He is the younger brother of Nikola Žigić.

Career
Born in Bačka Topola, Brako started his career together with his older brother Nikola, playing for local club AIK Bačka Topola. Later he played for Tekstilac Odžaci and Cement Beočin.

Proleter Novi Sad
Žigić joined Proleter Novi Sad for the 2007–08 season. After 2 seasons playing in the Serbian League Vojvodina, Žigić promoted with club in the Serbian First League. Playing with Proleter, Žigić made over 250 caps.

Career statistics

Managerial statistics

Honours

Player
Proleter Novi Sad
Serbian League Vojvodina: 2008–09

Assistant coach
Proleter Novi Sad
Serbian First League: 2017–18

References

External links
 

1981 births
Living people
People from Bačka Topola
Association football defenders
Serbian footballers
FK TSC Bačka Topola players
FK Cement Beočin players
FK Proleter Novi Sad players
Serbian First League players
Serbian football managers
FK Proleter Novi Sad managers
Serbian SuperLiga managers